Lockeford is an unincorporated community in San Joaquin County, California, United States. For statistical purposes, the United States Census Bureau has defined Lockeford as a census-designated place (CDP). The census definition of the area may not precisely correspond to local understanding of the area with the same name. The population was 3,521 at the 2020 census, up from 3,233 at the 2010 census.

History
Lockeford is registered as California Historical Landmark #365. The town is named after Dean Jewett Locke, who, with his brother Elmer, settled in the area in 1851. Dean Locke then established a ranch and later the town in the region. It was Dean Locke's wife Delia who first coined the name "Lockeford" in 1859, referencing the ford that he built across the Mokelumne River. Delia Locke's diaries chronicled the early history of Lockeford and her family's history in founding the town. They are available at the University of the Pacific.

On June 13, 2022, Amazon announced that customers in Lockeford will be among the first in the United States to receive Amazon orders via the Amazon Prime Air drone delivery program.

Geography
Lockeford is located at  (38.157565, -121.151455).

The town is served by California State Route 88, one of four routes that crosses over the Sierra Nevada in the region.

Demographics

2010
The 2010 United States Census reported that Lockeford had a population of 3,233. The racial makeup of Lockeford was 2,526 (78.1%) White, 10 (0.3%) African American, 22 (0.7%) Native American, 64 (2.0%) Asian, 13 (0.4%) Pacific Islander, 413 (12.8%) from other races, and 185 (5.7%) from two or more races. Hispanic or Latino of any race were 956 persons (29.6%).

The Census reported that 3,217 people (99.5% of the population) lived in households, 16 (0.5%) lived in non-institutionalized group quarters, and 0 (0%) were institutionalized.

There were 1,142 households, out of which 401 (35.1%) had children under the age of 18 living in them, 650 (56.9%) were opposite-sex married couples living together, 103 (9.0%) had a female householder with no husband present, 73 (6.4%) had a male householder with no wife present.  There were 70 (6.1%) unmarried opposite-sex partnerships, and 5 (0.4%) same-sex married couples or partnerships. 257 households (22.5%) were made up of individuals, and 127 (11.1%) had someone living alone who was 65 years of age or older. The average household size was 2.82.  There were 826 families (72.3% of all households); the average family size was 3.32.

The population was spread out, with 829 people (25.6%) under the age of 18, 264 people (8.2%) aged 18 to 24, 743 people (23.0%) aged 25 to 44, 929 people (28.7%) aged 45 to 64, and 468 people (14.5%) who were 65 years of age or older.  The median age was 39.2 years. For every 100 females, there were 108.2 males.  For every 100 females age 18 and over, there were 101.8 males.

The homeowner vacancy rate was 2.3%; the rental vacancy rate was 11.1%.  2,278 people (70.5% of the population) lived in owner-occupied housing units and 939 people (29.0%) lived in rental housing units.

2000
As of the census of 2000, there were 3,179 people, 1,099 households, and 856 families residing in the CDP. The racial makeup of the CDP was 77.41% White, 0.25% African American, 1.04% Native American, 1.42% Asian, 0.38% Pacific Islander, 16.07% from other races, and 3.43% from two or more races. Hispanic or Latino of any race were 24.66% of the population.

There were 1,099 households, out of which 36.1% had children under the age of 18 living with them, 62.4% were married couples living together, 9.1% had a female householder with no husband present, and 22.1% were non-families. 18.2% of all households were made up of individuals, and 9.6% had someone living alone who was 65 years of age or older.  The average household size was 2.89 and the average family size was 3.26.

In the CDP, the population was spread out, with 27.8% under the age of 18, 8.6% from 18 to 24, 26.9% from 25 to 44, 23.0% from 45 to 64, and 13.7% who were 65 years of age or older.  The median age was 37 years. For every 100 females, there were 105.1 males.  For every 100 females age 18 and over, there were 102.4 males.

The median income for a household in the CDP was $43,750, and the median income for a family was $55,750. Males had a median income of $37,759 versus $24,353 for females. The per capita income for the CDP was $19,533.  About 10.5% of families and 12.5% of the population were below the poverty line, including 18.5% of those under age 18 and 3.6% of those age 65 or over.

Notable people 

 Weldon B. Cooke, Aviation pioneer
 Ken Shamrock, former UFC fighter and professional wrestler

References

External links
Diaries of Delia Locke, wife of Lockeford founder Dean Jewett Locke, from 1855 to 1879 are available online at the University of the Pacific Library Digital Collections.

Census-designated places in San Joaquin County, California
Census-designated places in California